Shaupeneak Mountain is a ridge located in the Catskill Mountains of New York south-southeast of Kingston. Fly Mountain is located northwest, and Hussey Hill is located north of Shaupeneak Mountain.

References

Mountains of Ulster County, New York
Mountains of New York (state)